Alejandro Febrero (25 February 1925 – 13 August 2010) was a Spanish freestyle swimmer. He competed in two events at the 1948 Summer Olympics.

References

External links
 

1925 births
2010 deaths
Spanish male freestyle swimmers
Olympic swimmers of Spain
Swimmers at the 1948 Summer Olympics
Swimmers from Madrid